Max Wentscher (12 May 18621942) was a German philosopher. He was a professor of philosophy at the University of Bonn.

His works include Metaphysik, Ethik, and Einführung in die Philosophie.

References

1862 births
1942 deaths
People from Grudziądz
19th-century German philosophers
20th-century German philosophers
Academic staff of the University of Bonn
19th-century German writers
19th-century German male writers